John St John (3 May 1702 – 1748) of Lydiard Tregoze, Wiltshire, was a British politician who sat in the House of Commons from 1727 to 1734.
 
St John was the second surviving son of  Henry St John, 1st Viscount St John MP, and his second wife Angelica Magdalena Wharton, widow of Phillip Wharton and daughter of Claude Pelissary, treasurer-general of the navy to Louis XIV. When John St. John was a child his elder half-brother, Bolingbroke, was attainted and excluded by special remainder from succeeding to the peerage. In 1721 his father invested £4,000  to acquire the reversion of a customs sinecure worth £1,200 a year for the lives of his two younger sons, John and Holles. St John  married Anne Furnese, daughter of Sir Robert Furnese, 2nd Baronet  of Waldershare, Kent on 17 April 1729,

At the 1727 British general election after coming of age, St John was returned as Member of Parliament for Wootton Bassett on the family interest. He voted with the Opposition except on the repeal of the Septennial Act in 1734. He did not stand again at the 1734 British general election.

St John was appointed Comptroller of customs in London in April 1740 holding the post for life. On his father's death on 8 April 1742, he succeeded not only to the title under special remainder as 2nd Viscount St. John but to Lydiard Park.  St. John's wife Anne died on 14 July 1747.  St John  married as his second wife Hester Clarke, daughter of James Clarke of Wharton, Herefordshire on 19 June 1748.
 
St. John died abroad in November 1748, leaving  three sons and three daughters.

References

1702 births
1748 deaths
People educated at Eton College
British expatriates in France
Members of the Parliament of Great Britain for English constituencies
Viscounts in the Peerage of Great Britain
British MPs 1727–1734